Măgura Stadium is a multi-use stadium in Șimleu Silvaniei. It is the home ground of Sportul Șimleu Silvaniei. It holds 1,537 people all on seats.

References

Football venues in Romania
Buildings and structures in Sălaj County
Șimleu Silvaniei